Al-Ḫaṣṣāf (died 874, full name Abū-Bakr Aḥmad Ibn-ʿUmar Ibn-Muhair aš-Šaibānī al-Ḫaṣṣāf)
was a Hanafite law scholar at the court of the 14th Abbasid Caliph al-Muhtadi.

A commentary on the work was written by al-Jaṣṣās in the 10th century.
An English translation was published by G. P. Verbit in 2008.

Al-Ḫaṣṣāf is also the author of a Kitāb al-ḥiyal wa-l-maḫārij, a work on legalistic trickery or ḥiyal, and a kitāb aḥkām al-awqāf, on religious institutions or waqf.

The earliest development of this field is the Kitāb al-maḫārij fī l-ḥiyal ("book of evasion and trickery")  by  Muhammad al-Shaybani (d. 805). A more comprehensive treatment is  the Kitāb al-ḥiyal wa-l-maḫārij
by Al-Hassaf.

Editions 
 al-Khaṣṣāf, Adab al-qāḍī, ed. Farḥāt Ziyāda (Cairo: American University in Cairo Press, 1978) 
 Abubakar Ahmad Ibn ‘Amr al-Khassaf, Kitab Ahkam al-Awqaf (Cairo: Diwan ‘Umum al-Awqaf al-Misriyyah, 1904)

References 

 Peter C. Hennigan: al-Khaṣṣāf (d. 261/874).n: Oussama Arabi, David Stephan Powers, Susan Ann Spectorsky: Islamic Legal Thought. A Compendium of Muslim Jurists Brill Academic Pub, 2013,  
 Mathieu Tillier: Women before the qāḍī under the Abbasids. In: Islamic Law and Society. Vol. 16 (2009), S. 280–302.
Tillier, Mathieu. (2009). Les cadis d’Iraq et l’État abbasside (132/750-334/945). Damascus: Institut français du Proche-Orient, 2009.
 Peter C Hennigan: The birth of a legal institution : the formation of the waqf in third-century A.H. Ḥanafī legal discourse.  Brill, Leiden 2003, .
 Ādāb al-Qāḍī : Islamic legal and judicial system. Aḥmad ibn ʻUmar Khaṣṣāf; ʻUmar ibn ʻAbd al-ʻAzīz Ṣadr al-Shahīd; Munir Ahmad Mughal
 Abū Bakr Aḥmad Ibn-ʿAmr Ibn-Muhair al-Ḫaṣṣāf aš-Šaibānī: Kitāb al-ḥiyal wa-l-maḫāriǧ. Ed. J. Schacht. Reprograf. Nachdr. der Ausg. Hannover 1923. Olms, Hildesheim 1968.
 Joseph Schacht (ed.): Das Kitāb al-hiial ual-mahāriǧ des Abū Bakr Aḥmad ibn ʿUmar ibn Muhair aš-Šaibānī-al-H̱aṣṣāf. Hannover, 1923 (Beiträge zur semitischen Philologie und Linguistik ; 4) 
 Christopher Melchert: Religious Policies of the Caliphs from al-Mutawakkil to al-Muqtadir, A H 232-295/A D 847-908. Islamic Law and Society, Vol. 3, No. 3 (1996), S. 316–342

870s deaths
People from Baghdad
Courtiers of the Abbasid Caliphate
Hanafi fiqh scholars
9th-century jurists
9th-century Arabs